Arthur Worrall (born 8 September 1869) was an English footballer who played as a forward. Worrall featured for clubs such as Barnsley, Leicester Fosse, Wolverhampton Wanderers and Woolwich Arsenal.

Career 
Worrall was a forward who started his playing career with Goldthorne Villa. He then followed up with spells at Wolverhampton Wanderers, Burton Swifts, and Leicester Fosse. Worrall then moved to Woolwich Arsenal where he brought his playing career to a close.

At Leicester Fosse he played four games, scoring three goals. His career at Leicester was cut short due to injury, and then a suspension by the club for poor conduct, and he moved on to Arsenal. While playing for Arsenal, Worrall played in ten games in 32 days in front of the public. 

A surviving service record indicates Worrall served in the military.

References

1869 births
Place of death missing
Year of death unknown
English footballers
Arsenal F.C. players
Barnsley F.C. players
Burton Swifts F.C. players
Wolverhampton Wanderers F.C. players
English Football League players
Association football forwards